Jot Singh Gunsola is an Indian politician from Uttarakhand and a two term Member of the Uttarakhand Legislative Assembly. Gunsola represents the Mussoorie (Uttarakhand Assembly constituency). He twice served as the Chairman of Mussoorie Municipal Council. Gunsola is a member of the Indian National Congress.

Positions held

References

 2007 Assembly Election
 2012 Assembly Election

External links 
 List of Chairmen of Mussoorie Municipal Council

Living people
20th-century Indian politicians
Indian National Congress politicians from Uttarakhand
Uttarakhand politicians
Year of birth missing (living people)
Uttarakhand MLAs 2002–2007
Uttarakhand MLAs 2007–2012